Závadka is a village and municipality in Michalovce District in the Košice Region of eastern Slovakia.

History
In historical records the village was first mentioned in 1418.

Geography
The village lies at an altitude of 107 metres and covers an area of 5.018 km². The municipality has a population of about 437 people.

Gallery

See also
 List of municipalities and towns in Michalovce District
 List of municipalities and towns in Slovakia

External links
http://www.statistics.sk/mosmis/eng/run.html

Villages and municipalities in Michalovce District